Paravelleda bispinosa is a species of beetle in the family Cerambycidae. It was described by Per Olof Christopher Aurivillius in 1910.

References

Phrissomini
Beetles described in 1910